Admiral The Hon. Walter Cecil Carpenter (27 March 1834 – 13 May 1904), also known as The Hon. Walter Cecil Talbot until he changed his name by Royal licence was a Royal Navy officer who became a Senior Officer, Coast of Ireland Station.

Early life
Walter Talbot (then so surnamed) was born on 27 March 1834 in Ingestre, Staffordshire, England and died on 13 May 1904 at Westminster part of central London, and he was buried on 15 May 1904 in Bolton-on-Swale, North Yorkshire, England. He was the second son of Henry Chetwynd-Talbot, 18th Earl of Shrewsbury and Lady Sarah Elizabeth, the daughter of Henry Beresford, 2nd Marquess of Waterford, by his marriage to Sarah Carpenter where upon he took her surname by royal licence. He played first-class cricket for the Marylebone Cricket Club in 1851, making a single appearance against Middlesex at Lord's.

Naval career
Walter Talbot (then so surnamed) entered the Royal Navy in 1847. He was aboard , in the West Indies, from 2 March 1865 to 14 April 1866.

Promoted to captain on 11 April 1866, he became commanding officer the frigate  in September 1867. He again commanded another naval cadet training ship,  from 16 December 1871 to 2 September 1873.

He was assigned as commanding officer of the battleship  in March 1880 and became commanding officer of the battleship  in March 1881. In addition he was cited as "Naval aide de camp" to Queen Victoria from 1880 to 1882.

Walter Carpenter (then so surnamed in 1868) was promoted to rear admiral on 29 December 1882 and was assigned as the Senior Officer, Coast of Ireland Station on 1 January 1887 before being promoted to vice admiral on 8 November 1888 and going on half pay in December 1888 due to illness. Promoted to full admiral on 28 May 1894, he fully retired on 11 March 1896.

Politics
Carpenter served as Member of Parliament for Waterford County from 1859 to 1865.

Family
Walter assumed, by Royal Licence dated 1 June 1868, the surname and arms of Carpenter, in lieu of those of Talbot, in accordance with the testamentary injunction of Sarah, Countess of Tyrconnell, widow of John Delavel Carpenter, last Earl of Tyrconnell.

Walter Carpenter (then so surnamed) married Maria Georgiana Mundy on 27 October 1869 at the Parish Church, Marylebone, London, England. She died in childbirth on 25 April 1876 in 33 Warwick Square, London, England.

Carpenter then married Beatrice, daughter of Thomas De Grey, 5th Baron Walsingham and Hon. Emily Elizabeth Julia Thellusson, on 10 February 1887 in St. George's, Hanover Square, London, England. Beatrice was born on 16 November 1853, christened in Merton, Norfolk, England and died on 16 October 1927. There were no children from this union.

Coat of arms
Walter Talbot, later surnamed Carpenter, inherited by Royal license and the required surname change, an Arms from his first wife, the widow Lady Carpenter. These arms appear to be of French or Norman heritage, "Paly of six, argent and gules, on a chevron azure, 3 cross crosslets or."  Crest, on a wreath a globe in a frame all or. Supporters, two horses, party-perfess, embattled argent and gules. Motto: "Per Acuta Belli" (Through the Asperities of War). These arms descend from John Carpenter, the younger (c. 1372 – 1442) who was the noted Town Clerk of London during the reigns of King Henry V & King Henry VI.

These arms are often referred to as the Hereford Arms, named for the later ancestral home of the Carpenter family in Hereford, England. The crest, supporters & motto apparently has changed several times over the centuries.

Because of the lack of surviving children of Walter Carpenter the COAs were later given by Royal license to another relative after his death in 1904. Sir William Boyd Carpenter (1841–1918), an English clergyman of the Established church of England, Bishop of Ripon, afterwards a Canon of Westminster and Chaplain to the reigning sovereign of England, wrote in a letter dated 7 August 1907 that his family bore the Hereford Arms. Sir Noel Paton, upon painting the Family Arms, informed him that the supporters were originally a round-handled sword, which in drawing over time became shortened, until nothing but the cross and globe were left beneath it. Those Hereford Arms were used by "John Carpenter, town clerk of London, who died 1442 A. D." His grandson, the subject of this article, John Boyd-Carpenter, Baron Boyd-Carpenter (1908–1998), continued the Arms into the new century by passing it down to his son, Thomas Boyd-Carpenter, who was himself knighted after a military career as a Lieutenant-General and for public service.

There is no direct male to male Carpenter descent connecting the Honorable Admiral Walter Carpenter & Sir William Boyd Carpenter. The family connection is by marriage through the females in the family.

The Hereford Coat of Arms described above should not be confused with the Arms of Bishop Richard Carpenter (c1450s?–1503) presented in the "Visitations of the County of Oxford taken in 1566, 1574, and 1634, published in 1871, which describe the arms displayed in the buildings at the University in Oxford – "In the Lyberarye of Baliall College." – as recorded by the officials performing the visitations in those years. The Visitations describe the arms of Bishop Richard Carpenter (c1450s–1503) as: "Paly of nine Gu. and Az. on a chevron Arg. surmounted by a mitre Or, three cross crosslets of—nine pales alternating red and blue, with a silver chevron bearing three gold cross-crosslets.

Ancestry

References

|-

1834 births
1904 deaths
Royal Navy admirals
Members of the Parliament of the United Kingdom for County Waterford constituencies (1801–1922)
UK MPs 1859–1865
Younger sons of earls
English cricketers
Marylebone Cricket Club cricketers
People educated at Harrow School